The 2003 GFS Marketplace 400 was the 23rd stock car race of the 2003 NASCAR Winston Cup Series. It was held on August 17, 2003 at Michigan International Speedway near Brooklyn, Michigan before a crowd of 150,000. The 200-lap race was won by Ryan Newman of the Penske Racing South team after he started from second position. Kevin Harvick of Richard Childress Racing finished second and Joe Gibbs Racing's Tony Stewart came in third.

Report

Background

The 2003 GFS Marketplace 400 was the 23rd of 36 scheduled stock car races of the 2003 NASCAR Winston Cup Series. It was held on August 17, 2003, in Brooklyn, Michigan, at Michigan International Speedway, one of six superspeedways to hold NASCAR races; the others are Daytona International Speedway, Auto Club Speedway, Indianapolis Motor Speedway, Pocono Raceway and Talladega Superspeedway. The standard track at Michigan International Speedway is a  four-turn superspeedway. The track's turns are banked at eighteen degrees, while the front stretch (the location of the finish line) is banked at twelve degrees. The back stretch, has a five degree banking.

Before the race Matt Kenseth led the Drivers' Championship with 3,294 points, ahead of Dale Earnhardt Jr. in second and Jeff Gordon in third. Jimmie Johnson and Kevin Harvick was fourth and fifth, and Michael Waltrip, Bobby Labonte, Kurt Busch, Ryan Newman and Robby Gordon rounded out the top ten. Chevrolet led the Manufacturers' Championship with 158 points, 21 ahead of their rival Ford in second. Dodge was third on 110 and Pontiac was fourth with 79.  Dale Jarrett was the race's defending champion.

Practice and qualifying

Three practice sessions were held before the Sunday race; one on Friday and two on Saturday. The first practice session lasted 60 minutes,  the second and final sessions lasted 45 minutes. Newman was fastest in the first practice session with a time of 38.221 seconds; Elliott Sadler was second and Harvick third. Bobby Labonte was fourth with a lap of 38.438 seconds, and Earnhardt placed fifth. Busch, Dale Jarrett, Johnson, Tony Stewart, Terry Labonte rounded out the session's top-ten drivers.

Although 44 drivers were entered in the qualifier; according to NASCAR's qualifying procedure only 43 could race. Each driver was limited to two timed laps, with the starting order determined by the competitor's fastest times. The qualifier was delayed for two hours because of rain which increased the track grip available to the drivers. Bobby Labonte clinched his second consecutive pole position at Michigan International Speedway, his fourth of the season and the 25th of his career with a time of 37.847 seconds. He was joined on the grid's front row by Newman. Robby Gordon qualified third, Kevin Lepage fourth, and Terry Labonte started fifth. Jason Leffler, Christian Fittipaldi, Jeff Burton, Dave Blaney and Jimmy Spencer rounded out the top ten qualifiers. Brett Bodine, Carl Long, Rich Bickle and Morgan Shepherd withdrew from the event prior to qualifying. The driver that failed to qualify was Stacy Compton. After the qualifier, Bobby Labonte said: "I just like coming here. It just falls into the category of a good track. The cars can race here from the white line (at the bottom of the banking) to the white wall, which is about 100 yards. That's a lot of fun."

On Saturday afternoon Johnson was fastest in the second practice session with a lap of 39.166 seconds, ahead of Bobby Labonte and Rusty Wallace. Harvick with a time of 39.224 was fourth-fastest; Sterling Marlin was fifth and Newman sixth. Greg Biffle, Terry Labonte, Johnny Benson Jr. and Stewart followed in the top ten. Later that day, Wallace paced the final practice session with a time of 39.816 seconds; Earnhardt was second and Busch. Jeff Green was fourth-fastest, ahead of Bobby Labonte and Newman. Waltrip was seventh-fastest, Stewart eighth, Jamie McMurray ninth and Biffle tenth. Jeremy Mayfield's tire blew, damaging his rear fender, and switched to a back-up car. Marlin's engine failed during the session, and Marlin changed engines.

Results

References

GFS Marketplace 400
GFS Marketplace 400
NASCAR races at Michigan International Speedway
August 2003 sports events in the United States